"Rock Star" is the third single from the R. Kelly album Double Up. The song features Ludacris and Kid Rock. It is notable for its use of the guitar, a distinct departure for the usually R&B–oriented Kelly. The song peaked at number 54 on the Billboard Hot R&B/Hip-Hop Songs chart in its second week on the chart.

Music video
The music video, directed by Kelly and Elliot Rosenblaut, was filmed at The Carousel in Lemont, Illinois. It begins with Kelly, Ludacris and Kid Rock on a tour bus, then entering an almost empty bar to play a gig. They set up their instruments and begin to play and the audience get interested in them and come closer. Ludacris is shown rapping at another area of the bar, then Kelly is shown singing to many women dancing in a tour bus. The video ends with the bar full of people cheering and chanting. During the on-stage shots, the rest of the band is portrayed by Chicago rock band Kill Hannah.

Track listing
 "Rock Star" (featuring Ludacris and Kid Rock)
 "Same Girl" (featuring Usher)
 "I'm a Flirt" (Mysto & Pizzi Remix)

Charts

References

2007 singles
2007 songs
Jive Records singles
R. Kelly songs
Ludacris songs
Kid Rock songs
Songs written by R. Kelly
Songs written by Ludacris